FTX is a defunct cryptocurrency exchange platform that operated from 2019 to 2022.

FTX may also refer to:

 Fault-Tolerant UNIX, a Stratus Technologies operating system
 FTX Games, an American video game publisher
 Field training exercise, a type of military exercise
 Toyota FTX, a make of car
 Ftx gene, a non-coding RNA gene in humans
 FtX (gender), a gender identity in Japan for nonbinary people born female
 Owando Airport (IATA code: FTX), an airport in the Republic of Congo

See also

 FXT (disambiguation)